Templemore railway station is a mainline railway station situated 2 km from the town of Templemore, Ireland. The station is on the Dublin-Cork railway line.

Details
The station has two platforms, and is fully accessible to wheelchair users since the addition of lifts at each end of a footbridge.

The station is approximately 2 km from the Garda Síochána College (main police training centre for Ireland).

History

The station opened on 3 July 1848.

See also
 List of railway stations in Ireland

References

External links
 Irish Rail Templemore Station Website
Templemore Station Car Parking information

Railway stations opened in 1848
Iarnród Éireann stations in County Tipperary
Templemore
Railway stations in the Republic of Ireland opened in 1848